Lester David Volk (September 17, 1884 – April 30, 1962) was an American physician, lawyer and politician from New York.

Life
Born in Brooklyn, New York, Volk attended the public and high schools. He graduated from Long Island College Hospital in 1906, practiced medicine, and was editor of the Medical Economist. He also studied law, graduated from Brooklyn Law School in 1911, was admitted to the bar in 1913, and practiced in Brooklyn.

Volk was a Progressive member of the New York State Assembly (Kings Co., 6th D.) in 1913. He was a coroner's physician in 1914. During World War I, he served as a first lieutenant in the Medical Corps with the American Expeditionary Forces in 1918 and 1919. He was largely instrumental in securing the soldiers' bonus granted by the State of New York. He was Judge Advocate of the Veterans of Foreign Wars for the State of New York in 1922.

Volk was elected as a Republican to the 66th United States Congress to fill the vacancy caused by the resignation of Reuben L. Haskell, and was re-elected to the 67th United States Congress, holding office from November 2, 1920, to March 3, 1923.

He served as member from New York City on the American Waterways Commission in 1924. He also served as Assistant New York Attorney General from March 1, 1943, to January 15, 1958.

Volk died on April 30, 1962, in Brooklyn, and was buried in Bayside Cemetery in Ozone Park, New York.

See also
List of Jewish members of the United States Congress

External links and sources
Lester Volk at the Political Graveyard

References

1884 births
1962 deaths
Brooklyn Law School alumni
Jewish members of the United States House of Representatives
United States Army officers
Republican Party members of the New York State Assembly
People from Brooklyn
New York (state) Progressives (1912)
20th-century American politicians
Republican Party members of the United States House of Representatives from New York (state)